Nono may refer to:

Places
 Nono, Argentina, a municipality  in the Province of Córdoba
 Nono, Ecuador, a parish in the municipality of Quito in the province of Pichincha
 Nono, Illubabor, Oromia (woreda), Ethiopia, or Nono Sele
 Nono, Illubabor, Oromia (town), in Nono woreda
 Nono, West Shewa, Oromia, Ethiopia, a woreda

Animals
 Black nono (Simulium buissoni), a midge species on the Marquesas Islands in Polynesia, with the common name nono or no-no
 White nono (Leptoconops albiventris), a midge species on the Marquesas Islands in Polynesia, with the common name nono or no-no

People
 Nonô (footballer, 1899-1931), full name Claudionor Gonçalves da Silva, Brazilian football forward
 Nonô (footballer, born 1940), full name Cláudionor Reinaldo Franco, Brazilian football defender
 Nono (footballer, born 1991), a Spanish winger for CD Tenerife, full name David González Plata
 Nono (footballer, born 1993), a Spanish midfielder, full name José Antonio Delgado Villar
 Nōno Chieko (born 1935), a Japanese politician
 Nonô Figueiredo (born 1971), a Brazilian auto racing driver
 Nono Lubanzadio (born 1980), a Congolese football player
 Ali Al-Nono (born 1980), a Yemeni football player
 Grace Nono, a female vocalist from the Philippines
 Hoda Nono, the Bahraini Ambassador to the United States
 Luigi Nono (1924–1990), an Italian composer
 Luigi Nono (painter) (19th century)`

Nicknames
 Norbert Krief, a French rock guitarist
 Nordahl Lelandais (b. 1983), a French ex-military, involved in criminal cases
 Nozomi Tsuji, a Japanese singer
 Pope Pius IX, whose Italian name is Pio Nono

Fictional characters
 Nono (Diebuster), a character in the anime series Diebuster
 Nono, a character in the anime series Planetes
 Nono, a small robot in the anime series Ulysses 31
 Nono (のの), a shy blue-haired shrine maiden in the anime series Popotan
 Nono Ichinose, a character in the manga Hitohira
 Nono, a moogle in the games Final Fantasy Tactics Advance, Final Fantasy XII, and Final Fantasy XII: Revenant Wings
Nono, a character in the anime series Toriko
 Noo-Noo, a character in the television series Teletubbies

Other
 NONO or Non-POU domain-containing octamer-binding protein, a protein that in humans is encoded by the NONO gene
 No-hitter, also called a no-no, a baseball game in which one team has no hits
 IX Nono Reparto Arditi, a Special Forces unit of the current Italian Army

See also
 "Nobody but Me", Isley Brothers' song noted for repeating the word "no"
 No-no (disambiguation)